"Shopping" (Korean : 쇼핑; RR: Syopping) is a Korean-language song by South Korean comedian Ryan Bang (Bang Hyun Sung), one of the mainstays of ABS-CBN noontime show It's Showtime. The song features Donnalyn Bartolome.

Music video
The song's accompanying music video was shot at the Resorts World Manila. The music video was shot in a style to Psy's singles "Gangnam Style" and "Gentleman".

At the start of the video, a rich gambler (Jayson Gainza) plays at the Resorts World's casino slot machine, holding and inserting a bundle of US$100 notes to no success. At the adjacent machine, Bang takes out a US$2 bill from his pocket. This produces a triple-line jackpot and much money for Bang. The rest of the video sees Bang splurging his newfound wealth, dancing with lady valets (notably Girls of FHM Mayumi Yokoyama, Kristine Santamena, Donnalyn Bartolome, and Yam Concepcion), later riding on a Ferrari F430 and dancing and frolicking with fellow Pinoy Big Brother: Teen Clash 2010 housemate James Reid at the NewPort mall.

Reception
Bang launched his single on June 16, 2015 (his 24th birthday) during an episode of It's Showtime, with the music video premiering on myx and YouTube. 2ne1 member Sandara Park also shared the new video via Twitter. The music video reached 500,000 views on YouTube five days after upload.

Other uses
The song was use for Fudgee Bar commercial with Alyssa Valdez, as Bang plays as volleyball coach.

Notable cast
 Ryan Bang – protagonist
 Jayson Gainza – rich gambler
 James Reid – casino playmate
 Eruption – store owner
 Donnalyn Bartolome – valet
 Yam Concepcion – valet
 Kristine Santamena – valet
 Mayumi Yokoyama – valet
 Sunshine Garcia – dancer
 Aiko Climaco – dancer

References

2015 singles
2015 songs
K-pop songs
Philippine pop songs
Korean-language songs